William David Besmanoff (October 4, 1932 – October 20, 2010) was a German boxer who was a heavyweight contender in the 1950s. He was born in Munich, Germany. His father was Jewish American. When Willi was 11, he was imprisoned in the Buchenwald concentration camp for a short time. In the 1950s he moved to Milwaukee, Wisconsin, and became an American citizen.

Making his professional debut in 1952, Besmanoff mainly fought in Germany for the first half of his career, before subsequently relocating to the United States. Besmanoff fought many top contenders of the era, including Sonny Liston, Archie Moore, George Chuvalo, Zora Folley, Eddie Machen, Roy Harris, Willie Pastrano and Bob Foster. He was also an early opponent of Cassius Clay. He retired in 1967, with a final record of 51–34–8.

Professional boxing record

|-
|align="center" colspan=8|51 Wins (19 knockouts, 32 decisions), 34 Losses (11 knockouts, 23 decisions), 8 Draws
|-
| align="center" style="border-style: none none solid solid; background: #e3e3e3"|Result
| align="center" style="border-style: none none solid solid; background: #e3e3e3"|Record
| align="center" style="border-style: none none solid solid; background: #e3e3e3"|Opponent
| align="center" style="border-style: none none solid solid; background: #e3e3e3"|Type
| align="center" style="border-style: none none solid solid; background: #e3e3e3"|Round
| align="center" style="border-style: none none solid solid; background: #e3e3e3"|Date
| align="center" style="border-style: none none solid solid; background: #e3e3e3"|Location
| align="center" style="border-style: none none solid solid; background: #e3e3e3"|Notes
|-align=center
|Loss
|53–32–8
|align=left| Dave Zyglewicz
|TKO
|3
|01/08/1967
|align=left| Sam Houston Coliseum, Houston, Texas
|align=left|
|-
|Loss
|53–31–8
|align=left| George Chuvalo
|RTD
|2
|27/05/1967
|align=left| Cocoa Expo Sports Center, Cocoa, Florida
|align=left|
|-
|Loss
|53–30–8
|align=left| George Chuvalo
|TKO
|3
|04/04/1967
|align=left| Miami Beach Auditorium, Miami Beach, Florida
|align=left|
|-
|Win
|53–29–8
|align=left| Mike Lanum
|KO
|9
|09/12/1966
|align=left| Civic Auditorium, Melbourne, Florida
|align=left|
|-
|Loss
|52–29–8
|align=left| Mike Lanum
|PTS
|10
|09/11/1966
|align=left| Melbourne, Florida
|align=left|
|-
|Win
|52–28–8
|align=left| Mike Lanum
|SD
|10
|01/11/1966
|align=left| Miami Beach Auditorium, Miami Beach, Florida
|align=left|
|-
|Win
|51–28–8
|align=left| Gene Idelette
|SD
|10
|22/09/1966
|align=left| Melbourne, Florida
|align=left|
|-
|Win
|50–28–8
|align=left| Willie Johnson
|UD
|10
|12/08/1966
|align=left| Civic Auditorium, Melbourne, Florida
|align=left|
|-
|Win
|49–28–8
|align=left| Aaron Beasley
|KO
|1
|22/07/1966
|align=left| Civic Auditorium, Melbourne, Florida
|align=left|
|-
|Win
|48–28–8
|align=left| Joe Louis White
|SD
|10
|01/07/1966
|align=left| Civic Auditorium, Melbourne, Florida
|align=left|
|-
|Loss
|47–28–8
|align=left| Amos Johnson
|TKO
|6
|17/12/1963
|align=left| Akron Armory, Akron, Ohio
|align=left|
|-
|Loss
|47–27–8
|align=left| Bob Foster
|KO
|3
|11/12/1963
|align=left| Norfolk, Virginia
|align=left|
|-
| Draw
|47–26–8
|align=left| Duke Sabedong
|PTS
|10
|14/11/1963
|align=left| Mechanics Hall, Worcester, Massachusetts
|align=left|
|-
|Win
|47–26–7
|align=left| Herb Siler
|TKO
|4
|05/07/1963
|align=left| Jacksonville Beach, Florida
|align=left|
|-
|Loss
|46–26–7
|align=left| Cassius Clay
|TKO
|7
|29/11/1961
|align=left| Freedom Hall, Louisville, Kentucky
|align=left|
|-
|Loss
|46–25–7
|align=left| Alejandro Lavorante
|TKO
|7
|28/08/1961
|align=left| San Francisco Civic Auditorium, San Francisco, California
|align=left|
|-
|Loss
|46–24–7
|align=left| George Chuvalo
|TKO
|4
|27/06/1961
|align=left| Maple Leaf Gardens, Toronto, Ontario
|align=left|
|-
|Loss
|46–23–7
|align=left| Young Jack Johnson
|SD
|10
|18/02/1961
|align=left| Fairgrounds Coliseum, Salt Lake City, Utah
|align=left|
|-
|Loss
|46–22–7
|align=left| Pete Rademacher
|UD
|10
|13/12/1960
|align=left| Cleveland Arena, Cleveland, Ohio
|align=left|
|-
|Win
|46–21–7
|align=left| Howard King
|SD
|10
|21/11/1960
|align=left| Las Vegas Convention Center, Las Vegas, Nevada
|align=left|
|-
|Win
|45–21–7
|align=left| Jimmy McCarter
|UD
|10
|18/10/1960
|align=left| Seattle Civic Auditorium, Seattle, Washington
|align=left|
|-
|Loss
|44–21–7
|align=left| Zora Folley
|UD
|10
|16/09/1960
|align=left| Southwest Washington Fairgrounds, Centralia, Washington
|align=left|
|-
|Loss
|44–20–7
|align=left| George Logan
|UD
|10
|08/08/1960
|align=left| Boise, Idaho
|align=left|
|-
|Loss
|44–19–7
|align=left| Archie Moore
|TKO
|10
|25/05/1960
|align=left| Indiana State Fair Coliseum, Indianapolis, Indiana
|align=left|
|-
|Loss
|44–18–7
|align=left| Tom McNeeley
|PTS
|10
|14/03/1960
|align=left| Boston Garden, Boston, Massachusetts
|align=left|
|-
|Loss
|44–17–7
|align=left| Bob Cleroux
|UD
|10
|05/02/1960
|align=left| Madison Square Garden, New York City
|align=left|
|-
|Loss
|44–16–7
|align=left| Sonny Liston
|TKO
|7
|09/12/1959
|align=left| Cleveland Arena, Cleveland, Ohio
|align=left|
|-
|Loss
|44–15–7
|align=left| Eddie Machen
|UD
|10
|16/09/1959
|align=left| Auditorium, Portland, Oregon
|align=left|
|-
|Win
|44–14–7
|align=left| Marty Marshall
|UD
|10
|01/08/1959
|align=left| Harding Stadium, Steubenville, Ohio
|align=left|
|-
|Win
|43–14–7
|align=left| Mike DeJohn
|UD
|10
|16/06/1959
|align=left| Milwaukee Auditorium, Milwaukee, Wisconsin
|align=left|
|-
|Win
|42–14–7
|align=left| Alvin Williams
|UD
|10
|18/05/1959
|align=left| Milwaukee Auditorium, Milwaukee, Wisconsin
|align=left|
|-
|Loss
|41–14–7
|align=left| Zora Folley
|UD
|10
|07/04/1959
|align=left| Denver, Colorado
|align=left|
|-
|Loss
|41–13–7
|align=left| Donnie Fleeman
|UD
|10
|26/01/1959
|align=left| Milwaukee Auditorium, Milwaukee, Wisconsin
|align=left|
|-
|Loss
|41–12–7
|align=left| Mike DeJohn
|UD
|10
|28/11/1958
|align=left| Madison Square Garden, New York City
|align=left|
|-
|Win
|41–11–7
|align=left| Alex Miteff
|RTD
|1
|23/09/1958
|align=left| Seattle Civic Auditorium, Seattle, Washington
|align=left|
|-
|Loss
|40–11–7
|align=left| Hal Carter
|UD
|10
|13/06/1958
|align=left| Madison Square Garden, New York City
|align=left|
|-
|Loss
|40–10–7
|align=left| Archie Moore
|SD
|10
|02/05/1958
|align=left| Freedom Hall, Louisville, Kentucky
|align=left|
|-
|Win
|40–9–7
|align=left| Pat McMurtry
|SD
|10
|04/02/1958
|align=left| Seattle Civic Auditorium, Seattle, Washington
|align=left|
|-
|Loss
|39–9–7
|align=left| Willie Pastrano
|UD
|10
|27/11/1957
|align=left| Miami Beach Auditorium, Miami Beach, Florida
|align=left|
|-
|Loss
|39–8–7
|align=left| Roy Harris
|UD
|10
|29/10/1957
|align=left| Sam Houston Coliseum, Houston, Texas
|align=left|
|-
|Loss
|39–7–7
|align=left| Yvon Durelle
|UD
|10
|25/09/1957
|align=left| Olympia Stadium, Detroit, Michigan
|align=left|
|-
|Loss
|39–6–7
|align=left| Alex Miteff
|UD
|10
|10/06/1957
|align=left| St. Nicholas Arena, New York City
|align=left|
|-
|Loss
|39–5–7
|align=left| Archie McBride
|UD
|10
|20/05/1957
|align=left| St. Nicholas Arena, New York City
|align=left|
|-
|Win
|39–4–7
|align=left| Bob Baker
|UD
|10
|01/04/1957
|align=left| St. Nicholas Arena, New York City
|align=left|
|-
|Win
|38–4–7
|align=left| Calvin Wilson
|UD
|10
|25/02/1957
|align=left| St. Nicholas Arena, New York City
|align=left|
|-
|Win
|37–4–7
|align=left| Don Ellis
|PTS
|8
|20/10/1956
|align=left| Westfalenhallen, Dortmund, North Rhine-Westphalia
|align=left|
|-
|Win
|36–4–7
|align=left| Albert Westphal
|TKO
|5
|21/09/1956
|align=left| Ernst Merck Halle, Hamburg
|align=left|
|-
|Win
|35–4–7
|align=left| Artenio Calzavara
|PTS
|8
|15/09/1956
|align=left| Velodromo Vigorelli, Milan, Lombardy
|align=left|
|-
|Win
|34–4–7
|align=left| Maurice Mols
|TKO
|9
|07/09/1956
|align=left| Ostseehalle, Kiel, Schleswig-Holstein
|align=left|
|-
|Win
|33–4–7
|align=left| Eugene D'Alessio
|PTS
|8
|28/06/1956
|align=left| Sportpalast, Schoeneberg, Berlin
|align=left|
|-
|Win
|32–4–7
|align=left| Erwin Hack
|PTS
|8
|09/06/1956
|align=left| Rheinlandhalle, Krefeld, North Rhine-Westphalia
|align=left|
|-
|Win
|31–4–7
|align=left| Uwe Janssen
|KO
|8
|11/05/1956
|align=left| Ernst Merck Halle, Hamburg
|align=left|
|-
|Win
|30–4–7
|align=left| Simon Ayankin
|PTS
|8
|02/03/1956
|align=left| Ernst Merck Halle, Hamburg
|align=left|
|-
|Win
|29–4–7
|align=left| Jacques Bro
|PTS
|8
|04/02/1956
|align=left| Festhalle Frankfurt, Frankfurt, Hesse
|align=left|
|-
|Win
|28–4–7
|align=left| Alex Buxton
|PTS
|8
|22/01/1956
|align=left| Westfalenhallen, Dortmund, North Rhine-Westphalia
|align=left|
|-
|Win
|27–4–7
|align=left| Maurice DeMulder
|KO
|4
|13/01/1956
|align=left| Sportpalast, Schoeneberg, Berlin
|align=left|
|-
|Loss
|26–4–7
|align=left| Jacques Bro
|PTS
|6
|05/12/1955
|align=left| Luxembourg City
|align=left|
|-
|Loss
|26–3–7
|align=left| Willi Hoepner
|PTS
|10
|25/11/1955
|align=left| Ernst Merck Halle, Hamburg
|align=left|
|-
|Win
|26–2–7
|align=left| Heinz Sachs
|KO
|6
|14/10/1955
|align=left| Ostseehalle, Kiel, Schleswig-Holstein
|align=left|
|-
|Win
|25–2–7
|align=left| José González Sales
|PTS
|8
|09/09/1955
|align=left| Sportpalast, Schoeneberg, Berlin
|align=left|
|-
|Win
|24–2–7
|align=left| Ed Smith
|PTS
|8
|22/07/1955
|align=left| Ernst Merck Halle, Hamburg
|align=left|
|-
| Draw
|23–2–7
|align=left| Heinz Sachs
|PTS
|8
|12/06/1955
|align=left| Westfalenhallen, Dortmund, North Rhine-Westphalia
|align=left|
|-
|Loss
|23–2–6
|align=left| Franz Szuzina
|PTS
|8
|04/06/1955
|align=left| Eisstadion, Cologne, North Rhine-Westphalia
|align=left|
|-
|Win
|23–1–6
|align=left| Roland Guille
|KO
|3
|20/05/1955
|align=left| Sportpalast, Schoeneberg, Berlin
|align=left|
|-
| Draw
|22–1–6
|align=left| Ed Smith
|PTS
|8
|27/03/1955
|align=left| Westfalenhallen, Dortmund, North Rhine-Westphalia
|align=left|
|-
|Win
|22–1–5
|align=left| Wim Snoek
|PTS
|8
|11/03/1955
|align=left| Ernst Merck Halle, Hamburg
|align=left|
|-
|Win
|21–1–5
|align=left| Clair Redmond
|KO
|2
|11/02/1955
|align=left| Sportpalast, Schoeneberg, Berlin
|align=left|
|-
|Win
|20–1–5
|align=left| Winfried Henne
|TKO
|4
|21/01/1955
|align=left| Ernst Merck Halle, Hamburg
|align=left|
|-
|Win
|19–1–5
|align=left| Artenio Calzavara
|PTS
|8
|10/12/1954
|align=left| Sportpalast, Schoeneberg, Berlin
|align=left|
|-
|Win
|18–1–5
|align=left| Domingo Lopez
|DQ
|8
|25/09/1954
|align=left| Weser-Ems-Halle, Oldenburg, Lower Saxony
|align=left|
|-
|Win
|17–1–5
|align=left| Franz Szuzina
|PTS
|10
|27/08/1954
|align=left| Sportpalast, Schoeneberg, Berlin
|align=left|
|-
| Draw
|16–1–5
|align=left| Franz Szuzina
|PTS
|8
|11/07/1954
|align=left| Westfalenhallen, Dortmund, North Rhine-Westphalia
|align=left|
|-
|Win
|16–1–4
|align=left| Marcel Limage
|PTS
|8
|10/06/1954
|align=left| Sportpalast, Schoeneberg, Berlin
|align=left|
|-
|Win
|15–1–4
|align=left| Austin Jones
|PTS
|8
|09/04/1954
|align=left| Ernst Merck Halle, Hamburg
|align=left|
|-
| Draw
|14–1–4
|align=left| José González Sales
|PTS
|8
|05/03/1954
|align=left| Sportpalast, Schoeneberg, Berlin
|align=left|
|-
|Loss
|14–1–3
|align=left| Hans Friedrich
|PTS
|8
|22/01/1954
|align=left| Sportpalast, Schoeneberg, Berlin
|align=left|
|-
|Win
|14–0–3
|align=left| Emile DeGreef
|KO
|3
|15/01/1954
|align=left| Ernst Merck Halle, Hamburg
|align=left|
|-
|Win
|13–0–3
|align=left| Jean Serres
|TKO
|5
|27/12/1953
|align=left| Sportpalast, Schoeneberg, Berlin
|align=left|
|-
|Win
|12–0–3
|align=left| Ray Schmit
|PTS
|6
|04/12/1953
|align=left| Sportpalast, Schoeneberg, Berlin
|align=left|
|-
|Win
|11–0–3
|align=left| Hans Baumann
|PTS
|6
|13/11/1953
|align=left| Seeback Saal, Bremerhaven, Bremen
|align=left|
|-
|Win
|10–0–3
|align=left| Karl Ameisbichler
|TKO
|8
|07/10/1953
|align=left| Ernst-Merck-Halle, Hamburg
|align=left|
|-
|Win
|9–0–3
|align=left| Willy Schagen
|KO
|2
|28/08/1953
|align=left| Sportpalast, Schoeneberg, Berlin
|align=left|
|-
|Win
|8–0–3
|align=left| Paul Schirrmann
|PTS
|4
|05/07/1953
|align=left| Waldbühne, Westend, Berlin
|align=left|
|-
| Draw
|7–0–3
|align=left| Hans Strelecki
|PTS
|6
|16/05/1953
|align=left| Sportpalast, Schoeneberg, Berlin
|align=left|
|-
| Draw
|7–0–2
|align=left| Karl Ameisbichler
|PTS
|6
|17/04/1953
|align=left| Funkturmhalle, Westend, Berlin
|align=left|
|-
| Draw
|7–0–1
|align=left| Otto Bastian
|PTS
|6
|15/02/1953
|align=left| Ausstellungshalle, Berlin
|align=left|
|-
|Win
|7–0
|align=left| Heinz Schreiber
|KO
|2
|26/12/1952
|align=left| Funkturmhalle, Westend, Berlin
|align=left|
|-
|Win
|6–0
|align=left| Bruno Junkuhn
|KO
|2
|21/11/1952
|align=left| Winterhalle, Munich, Bavaria
|align=left|
|-
|Win
|5–0
|align=left| Robert Sapion
|PTS
|6
|09/11/1952
|align=left| Funkturmhalle, Westend, Berlin
|align=left|
|-
|Win
|4–0
|align=left| Willy Schmauser
|PTS
|6
|17/10/1952
|align=left| Messehalle, Munich, Bavaria
|align=left|
|-
|Win
|3–0
|align=left| Franz Schoepgens
|TKO
|2
|14/09/1952
|align=left| Praelat Schoeneberg, Schoeneberg, Berlin
|align=left|
|-
|Win
|2–0
|align=left| Emil Dimmer
|PTS
|4
|05/09/1952
|align=left| Ausstellungshalle, Munich, Bavaria
|align=left|
|-
|Win
|1–0
|align=left| Heinz Schreiber
|KO
|4
|15/08/1952
|align=left| Funkturmhalle, Westend, Berlin
|align=left|

References

External links
 

1932 births
2010 deaths
Heavyweight boxers
German male boxers
Sportspeople from Munich
German emigrants to the United States
Buchenwald concentration camp survivors